German Bank is a historic commercial building located in downtown Evansville, Indiana. It was built in 1857, and is a three-story, Italianate style brick building.  The building features a corner tower, encaustic tile, a decorative cornice, and three-story cast iron porch.

It was listed on the National Register of Historic Places in 1982.

References

Bank buildings on the National Register of Historic Places in Indiana
Italianate architecture in Indiana
Commercial buildings completed in 1857
Buildings and structures in Evansville, Indiana
National Register of Historic Places in Evansville, Indiana
1857 establishments in Indiana